In commutative algebra, a Rees decomposition is a way of writing a ring in terms of polynomial subrings.

Definition

Suppose that a ring R is a quotient of a polynomial ring k[x1,...] over a field by some homogeneous ideal. A Rees decomposition of R is a representation of R as a direct sum (of vector spaces)

 

where each ηα is a homogeneous element and the d elements θi are a homogeneous system of parameters for R and
ηαk[θfα+1,...,θd] ⊆ k[θ1, θfα].

See also

 Stanley decomposition
 Hironaka decomposition

References

 

Commutative algebra